The Beeline Dragway was a drag racing facility in Mesa, Arizona that operated from 1963 to the 1980s.

References

External links
 1965 race at the track
 

Mesa, Arizona
Drag racing venues